Justice Spencer may refer to:

Harry A. Spencer, associate justice of the Nebraska Supreme Court
James Spencer (South Dakota judge), associate justice of the South Dakota Supreme Court
John W. Spencer, associate justice of the Supreme Court of Indiana
William B. Spencer, associate justice of the Louisiana Supreme Court